Street Sounds Crucial Electro 3 is the third compilation album in a series and was released 1987 on the StreetSounds label. The album was released on LP and cassette and contains twenty electro music and old school hip hop tracks mixed by Herbie Laidley.

Track listing

References

External links
 Street Sounds Crucial Electro 3 at Discogs

1987 compilation albums
Hip hop compilation albums
Electro compilation albums